Joseph C. Winkler (March 9, 1922 – March 21, 2001) was an American football center who played one season with the Cleveland Rams of the National Football League. He played college football at Purdue University and attended Catholic Central High School in Hammond, Indiana.

Early years
Winkler played high school football at Bishop Noll Institute as a fullback. He earned Indiana Catholic all-state and Chicago Area All-Catholic team honors. He was also a two-time winner of the team’s Outstanding Player award. Winkler graduated in 1941. He was inducted into the Hammond Sports Hall of Fame in 2002.

College career
Winkler played for Purdue Boilermakers as a center and graduated in 1945.

Professional career
Winkler was selected by the Cleveland Rams with the 114th pick in the 1945 NFL Draft and played in eight games for the team during the 1945 season.

References

External links
Just Sports Stats

1922 births
2001 deaths
Players of American football from Indiana
American football centers
Purdue Boilermakers football players
Cleveland Rams players
Sportspeople from Hammond, Indiana
People from Lansing, Illinois